World War II did not cause a major change in women's labor force participation after it ended and returning male soldiers reclaimed their jobs. Women's labor force participation post World War II are correlated with mobilization rates in their respective states. This outward shift in the labor supply by location was maintained through the 1950s and 1960s. More educated women who were married with children during World War II were most impacted by mobilization. Their support to labor force participation was due to the rise of the tertiary sector, increase in part-time jobs, adoption of labor-saving household technologies, and education.

Prior to WWII 

Before World War II, there existed persistent and systematic discrimination against women workers. Many women working in the labor force prior to the war were usually impoverished and minorities. Women who worked outside their homes prior to World War II had jobs as receptionists, secretaries and department store clerks. Society had the notion that women of the middle and upper classes should never go into the outside workforce because it was beneath them. This allowed for the inclusion of legal bars to married women working in many professions. During the high unemployment of the Great Depression many thought men should have hiring preference to allow at least one provider for every family. The U.S culture encouraged women to gain employment before marriage, but upon marriage to dedicate themselves to their main duty: maintaining the family home. The important anti-discrimination legislation Equal Pay Act of 1963 would not be passed until 1963. In 1940, 28% of women over 14 participated in the labor force while men over the age of 10 had a 96% workforce participation rate.

During WWII 

The war caused the mobilization of 16 million American men. But the states’ contribution to America's mobilization varied between 40% (Georgia) and 53.6% (Maine) of eligible men, hence the impact on subgroups varied. In 1945, 37% of women were employed, encouraged by factors such as war time propaganda or the positive income effect of husbands in the military earning less. The government had created posters and films of women in the workplace in order to persuade American women to serve their country by joining the workforce, taking over for the men. Virtually 1 in 4 married women were working in the outside workforce by 1945. As a result of higher paying jobs being filled by women, the number of domestic workers dropped dramatically. It became extremely hard to get women to work lower paying jobs such as at restaurants and laundromats. During the war nearly 6 million women joined the workforce. They had jobs such as steel workers, lumber workers, office workers, construction workers as well as non-combat pilots. Women worked long hours for less pay in dangerous conditions and often experienced sexual harassment on the job. By 1945 there were 4.7 women in clerical positions which was an 89% increase from women with this occupation prior to World War II. In addition, there were 4.5 million women working as factory operatives, this was a 112% increase since before the war. The aviation industry saw the highest increase in female workers during the war. By 1943 310,000 women worked in the US Aircraft Industry which made up 65% of the industry's total workforce. This was a huge increase since the number of women working in the aircraft industry prior to the war was only 1%. During the war 350,000 women worked for the US Armed Forces. By 1945 the Women’s Army Corps had more than 100,000 members and 6,000 female officers who worked more than 200 non-combatant jobs stateside. Women's Airforce Service Pilots were the first female pilots to fly military aircraft. These women transported cargo and assisted with target missions. More than 1,000 women served as Women's Airforce Service Pilots throughout the war; 38 lost their lives. 
Additionally, women in the workforce struggled with housework and finding childcare. Women spent hours washing and ironing clothes at home instead of going to laundromats because at the time women wanted to work higher-paying jobs, therefore it was hard to find people to fill these positions. Many women left their children at home without adult supervision or any form of childcare. Some women left their children at home with their husbands if they had different shifts, with their older children or relatives. Only 5% of American women had their children in daycare centers towards the beginning of the war. As a result, the government provided funding for childcare and welfare committees so that more women could enter the workforce.

While women's wages rose more relative to men's during this period, real wages did not increase due to higher wartime income taxes. Although jobs that had been previously closed to women opened up, demographics such as African American women who had already been participating more fully experienced less change. Their husbands' income effect was historically even more positive than white women's. During the war, African American women engagement as domestic servants decreased from 59.9% to 44.6%, but Karen Anderson in 1982 characterized their experience as “last hired, first fired.”

After WWII 

There has been controversy about the significance of World War higher-paying crease of women in the workplace. William Chafe in 1972 called the war a "watershed event" forcing a change in attitudes about women in the workforce. However women were also employed during World War I, and no such change in attitude occurred after that. By 1950 the portion of all women in the labor force was down to 32%, but married women had joined in extraordinary numbers over the previous decade, with most age groups increasing their labor participation by an unprecedented 10 percentage points. Claudia Goldin used Gladys Palmer's retrospective surveys of women and men's work history from 1940 to 1951 to track changes in weeks worked and labor force participation rate and correlated that with states’ mobilization rates. World War II mobilization had little impact on the long term labor force participation of women without a high school diploma, however, it appears to have had some positive effect on the long term participation of more highly educated white women, especially those who were married during the war.

Nevertheless, the bulk of evidence suggests that the influx of women into the workforce during and after the war was primarily due to other, longer-term trends. Other important factors at the time that led to general increases in women's participation in the workforce include: the rise of the tertiary sector (see table), increases in part-time jobs, adoption of labor saving household technologies, increased education, and the elimination of "marriage bar" laws and policies. "Marriage bars" forbidding the employment of married women in various government and white-collar positions were especially common during the Depression, but in the early 1940s they were largely eliminated. Part-time jobs gave added flexibility with raising children. Labor saving devices lowered the time cost of homemaking. Expanding high school and college education better prepared women for employment. There was also a decline in the stigma that a husband's worth was less if the wife worked. The divorce rate was still low in the 1940s and 50s and less important as a factor. Labor force participation was no longer only a transitory phase of a woman's life, as women transitioned to a role of both mothers and workers. Middle-class mothers as well as the poor were burdened by the double shift of working a job and in the home.

In the table below is a breakdown by sector of jobs held by women in 1940 and 1950. Women overwhelmingly worked in jobs segmented by sex. Women were still highly employed as textile workers and domestic servants, but the clerical and service field greatly expanded. This tertiary sector was more socially acceptable and many more educated women entered. Wages were low, averaging roughly 60% of men's and there was little room for advancement.

See also 

United States home front during World War II
Rosie the Riveter
Women in the workforce

References 

History of women in the United States
20th-century American women
American women in World War II